Engku Muhammad Nur Shakir bin Engku Yacob (born 16 October 1998) is a Malaysian professional footballer who plays as a forward for Malaysia Super League club Terengganu.

Shakir started his journey from sports school in secondary school. He is the 3rd child from four siblings. ( Older sister, Older brother, and Youngest brother). As well, his youngest brother did play for the Terengganu youth club.

References

External links
 

1998 births
Living people
Malaysian footballers
Terengganu F.C. II players
Terengganu FC players
Malaysia Super League players
Malaysian people of Malay descent
Association football forwards